Lucius Levy Solomons (born 1730 in England – died May 18, 1792 at Montreal) was a Jewish Canadian merchant and fur trader.

References

1730 births
1792 deaths
Canadian Jews
Canadian fur traders
English emigrants to pre-Confederation Quebec
English Jews
Pre-Confederation Canadian businesspeople
People of pre-Confederation Canada
Immigrants to New France